Frank Kovanda (September 14, 1904 – April 21, 1993) was an internationally known American maker of bows for stringed instruments (an archetier).

Born in Chicago, he began his profession there in 1921 while attending Harrison Technical High School, from which he graduated the next year; he learned from and worked for violin maker John Hornsteiner.

He was for many years associated with William Lewis and Son in Chicago (1924-1945), where he gained recognition for his outstanding ability as a maker of fine bows and their fittings. While in the employ of Lewis and Sons, he also repaired and restored the finest bows that came through the shop. He was hailed as a superb copyist by many including William Lewis and Joseph Roda. He moved to Los Angeles in 1946, where he opened his own shop, catering to the elite players of the Silver Screen. Frank Kovanda, enjoyed international fame as a master maker of violin, viola and 'cello bows par excellence. During his years at William Lewis & Sons in Chicago (1924-1945), Mr. Kovanda numbered among his patrons practically all of the world's great violinists, including such artists as Mischa Elman, Jascha Heifetz, Emanuel Feuermann, Zino Francescatti, Raya Garbousova, Louis Kaufman, Fritz Kreisler, Yehudi Menuhin, Nathan Milstein, Gregor Piatigorsky, William Primrose, Joseph Schuster and Joseph Szigeti.

He produced superb copies of bows originally made by Francois Tourte, Dominique Peccatte, Nicolaus Kittel and other famous makers. He also reproduced bow frogs (the heel of the bow).

According to 1952 Lewis Collection catalog: Frank Kovanda c. 1938 bow mounted in gold/ebony, octagonal bow Lewis No.748, price $150 on par with Sartory, Dodd, Audinot, Thomassin.

"One of the great American makers of the mid-20 century. After working many years for Lewis & Sons, he moved to Los Angeles after WWII and established own shop there. Made several hundred bows. Was greatly influenced by the work of F.X. TOURTE. Branded "F.KOVANDA". Some bows were left unstamped (as they were reproductions)."- Gennady Filimonov

References

 "Who is who in Music" 1970 Lee Stern Press
 "The Lewis Collection"  catalogue 1952
 La Liuteria Lombarda del '900 - Roberto Codazzi, Cinzia Manfredini 2002

 
John H. Fairfield - Known Violin Makers

1904 births
1993 deaths
Bow makers
American luthiers
People from Chicago